Azizlu (also known as ‘Azīzollāh and ‘Azīzollāh Qeshlāq) is a village in Chahardangeh Rural District, Hurand District, Ahar County, East Azerbaijan Province, Iran. At the 2006 census, its population was 185, in 29 families.

References 

Populated places in Ahar County